William Green House may refer to:

William Green House (Rochester, Iowa)
Capt. William Green House, Wakefield, Massachusetts
William Green House (Ewing Township, New Jersey)

See also
Green House (disambiguation)